Taksar may refer to:

 Taksar, Syangja, Nepal
 Taksar, Bhojpur, Nepal